The Mokri tribe is a Kurdish tribe residing in West Azerbaijan Province, Iran. Mokri princes made up the ruling class of the emirate of Mukriyan.

History
The Mokri are notable for having produced many distinguished figures, such as Aziz Khan Mokri, who served as commander-in-chief of the army from 1853 to 1857. 

Abbas I of Persia married a Mokri noblewoman in 1610 CE; she was known to be popular among the Mokri.

Mokri women traditionally mixed with men and did not veil, it was also standard for Mokris to greet guests with cheek kisses even between opposite genders. However, despite their free association with men, women had to, historically, abide to the Mokri patriarchal code to "retain their honor” such as not engaging in adultery, which includes subtle romance such as courtship and romantic relationships with the absence of sex which was otherwise tolerated by the surrounding Bolbas tribes like the  Mangur.

See also 
 Mukriyan

References

Sources 
 

Kurdish tribes
West Azerbaijan Province